Karim Wagih is an Egyptian sport shooter who competes in the men's 10 metre air pistol. At the 2012 Summer Olympics, he finished 38th in the qualifying round, failing to make the cut for the final.

References

Egyptian male sport shooters
Year of birth missing (living people)
Living people
Olympic shooters of Egypt
Shooters at the 2012 Summer Olympics
21st-century Egyptian people